Copelatus melanogrammus is a species of diving beetle. It is part of the genus Copelatus, which is in the subfamily Copelatinae of the family Dytiscidae. It was described by Régimbart in 1883.

References

melanogrammus
Beetles described in 1883